Héctor Eduardo Reglero Montaner (born September 8, 1957), better known as Ricardo Montaner, is an Argentine-born Venezuelan singer and songwriter. Since starting his career in the late 1970s, he has released more than 24 albums, and many successful singles. He has sold an estimated 100 million records worldwide, making him one of the best-selling Latin music artists.

Biography

Early years
Montaner was born as Héctor Eduardo Reglero Montaner, in Valentín Alsina, Buenos Aires Province, Argentina. His family moved to Venezuela when he was 6 years old. During his youth, he performed in the church choir in the city of Maracaibo. The first song he internationally performed in a festival in Peru was "Canta, viejo, canta". After this, he decided to choose his artistic name Ricardo Montaner (using his maternal family name).

In 1976, he recorded his first single named Mares produced by the Venezuelan italian singer Roberto Luti. The same year he participated in the Ancon Festival (a Peruvian music festival from 1968 to 1984), where he gained some popularity after performing his song "Murallas".

In 1983, he released his first album titled Cada Día. Although the album was not a great success in Venezuela, it was a start for Montaner's career in Venezuela. It wasn't until 1987 that Montaner became widely popular in Venezuela, with the singles "Yo Que Te Amé" and  "Vamos a Dejarlo" from his self-titled album.

Success
The following year he came out with Ricardo Montaner 2 which featured hit songs like "Tan Enamorados" and "A Donde Va el Amor". At the same time, he acted in the popular telenovela (soap opera), Niña Bonita. This became a starting point to make his songs known to the rest of Latin America where he won 4 platinum albums in Argentina alone. His next two albums, Un Toque de Misterio and En el Último Lugar del Mundo, became big hits in the Mexican charts, also in Central and South America he had hits such as "La Cima del Cielo", "Me Va a Extrañar", "Déjame Llorar" and "Será".

By 1992, Ricardo decided to hit the Spanish Caribbean with Los Hijos del Sol, an album that contained songs like "Castillo Azul", "Honda" and "Piel Adentro". That year, he also recorded a duet with Michelle, which was the Latin American version for the Aladdin song "A Whole New World" titled "Un Mundo Ideal". In the same year, he performed his live concert in Madison Square Garden with more than 16,000 people who attended the concert. Additionally, he released singles such as "La pequeña Venecia" in which he demonstrates his immense love and appreciation towards his naturalized country of Venezuela, in which he refers to Venezuela as his country. Montaner was nominated for three Lo Nuestro Awards in 1993: Pop Artist of the Year, and Pop Song and Video of the Year for the single "Castillo Azul".

Although Montaner has written most of his songs he has worked closely with other songwriters in Latin America such as Pablo Manavello, Ilan Chester, and Oscar Gómez.  But in 1994, Ricardo Montaner wrote and produced all the songs in his album Una Mañana y un Camino, which became popular only years after his release due to the lack of promotion by his new record label EMI Latin, with which Ricardo would also release Viene del Alma in 1995, an Italian pop music themed album. Also in 1995, he teamed up with Yolandita Monge to establish a Guinness World Record for performing three concerts in different cities on the same day in Puerto Rico. This was only possible by air transportation via helicopter from stage to stage.

Changes in style
By 1997, Montaner again worked with Pablo Manavello and was signed under a new record company, Warner Music. Es Así brought Ricardo attention in the Spanish-speaking areas of the United States and allowed Montaner to tour more than 17 countries in Latin America. Songs like "La Mujer de Mi Vida", "Para Llorar" and "Es Así" became very popular all around.

In 1999, Montaner recorded his greatest hits album of his well-known songs featuring the London Metropolitan Orchestra. This was also a hit upon release, selling over 1 million copies. Ricardo made another attempt in 2001 with Sueño Repetido that included the bolero-style song "Bésame" arranged by Bebu Silvetti. Again, the song enjoyed immense success all over the world. Succeeding collaboration with Juan Carlos Calderón, Kike Santander, and Silvetti further propelled Ricardo's career to new heights in 2002, 2003, and 2004.

2002's Suma (Bolero style songs) and 2003's Prohibido Olvidar (balada pop) had fair results in terms of sales. "Si Tuviera Que Elegir" in Suma was written for his daughter. In 2003, he broke the record for the most concerts on the same tour in the theater of Bellas Artes in Puerto Rico. He sold out 18 concerts breaking his past record of 12, which was held previously by Yolandita Monge and Ricardo Arjona. In 2004, he made another album with the London Metropolitan Orchestra named Con La London Metropolitan Orchestra Vol. 2 featuring his latest hits songs and two exclusive songs such as "Desesperado" and "Esta Escrito". In 2005, Montaner launched Todo y Nada which featured the songs "Cuando a mi Lado Estas" and "Nada". For this album, he was nominated in the Latin Grammys for Album and Song of the Year for "Cuando a mi Lado Estas". "Amarte es mi Pecado" and "Heridas de Amor" are non-album songs that have been chosen to be the theme songs on two Mexican soap operas.

Recent years
In 2007, Ricardo released Las Mejores Canciones Del Mundo produced by Argentinean producer Adrian Posse with the songs "Hoy Tengo Ganas de Ti", "Nostalgias (Argen Version)", "Échame A Mí La Culpa (Artista Invitado: Juanes)".

In 2008, he released Las Mejores Canciones Del Mundo II – Y Algunas Mías...! with the songs "Cuando Un Amigo Se Va", "Ansiedad", "Bésame (Featuring Pasión Vega)". In 2009, Montaner received the ASCAP Latin Heritage Award.  His album "Viajero Frecuente" (Frequent Traveler) was launched on October 16, 2012, on iTunes, his first with Sony Music. The recording features a duet with his daughter actress and singer Evaluna Montaner, "La Gloria de Dios" (The Glory of God) whose video has more than 433 million views on YouTube/Vevo. Ricardo Montaner has sold over 65 million albums and keeps breaking records in arenas and theaters all over the world. One of the most remarkable was in Mar del Plata in Argentina where 220,000 people attended the concert that night. Montaner started his "Viajero Frecuente Tour 2013" in Mexico on January 24, 2013. The Special Edition of the "Viajero Frecuente" album released also in México featured a duet with Spanish musician Alejandro Sanz.

In October 2016, "Ida y Vuelta" was released, containing 20 songs, of which 11 were written by him. This album is different because he sang nine songs written by well known Mexican singers; in return, those Mexican singers sang some of Montaner's songs, all in the same album. A month later, Montaner received the Latin Grammy Lifetime Achievement Award.

Personal life
Montaner is married to Marlene Rodríguez Miranda, the daughter of shareholder and owner of the former Venezuelan record company Sonorodven, where Montaner started his career. He has three children with Marlene: Ricardo, Mauricio, and Evaluna. He also has two older sons from a previous marriage with Ana Vaz: Alejandro and Héctor Jr. All of them are singers: Evaluna, Héctor, and Alejandro perform independently, while Mauricio and Ricardo formed a duo together known as Mau y Ricky.

In 1994, after Montaner fell out with his record label Sonorodven, he signed with Sonográfica. This was cause for a legal dispute between the two companies, exacerbating a struggle between them which has gone on since about 2006.

Discography

Filmography
Betty La Fea (himself), 2000
 Los Reyes (himself), 2005
 Rebelde (Mexican telenovela) (himself), 2005
 Casi angeles (telenovela argentina) (himself), 2009 
 La Voz Colombia, 2012–2013 
 La Voz Argentina, 2018–present
 La Voz Mexico, 2019–2020
 La Voz Senior'', 2019–2021

See also

List of singer-songwriters/Venezuela

References

External links

 
 Lyrics to all of Ricardo Montaner's songs
 Ricardo Montaner, Nuevos ´Ålbums – Billboard En Español

1957 births
Living people
Argentine emigrants to Venezuela
Capitol Latin artists
Latin Grammy Award winners
Latin Grammy Lifetime Achievement Award winners
Latin music songwriters
Latin pop singers
Naturalized citizens of Venezuela
People from Lanús
People from Maracaibo
Rodven Records artists
Sony Music Latin artists
Venezuelan expatriates in the United States
Venezuelan pop singers
Warner Music Latina artists
20th-century Venezuelan male singers
21st-century Venezuelan male singers